Andrew Campbell may refer to:

Sports 

 Andrew Campbell (rower) (born 1992), American rower
 Andrew Campbell (outfielder) (born 1992), Australian baseball player 
 Andrew Campbell (ice hockey) (born 1988), Canadian ice hockey player
 Andrew Campbell (sailor) (born 1984), American yachtsman
 Andrew Campbell (cricketer) (born 1949), former English cricketer and barrister
 Andy Campbell (born 1979), English football player
 Andy Campbell (basketball) (born 1956), Australian Olympic basketball player
 Andrew Campbell (catcher) (1875–?), pre-Negro leagues baseball player
 Andrew Campbell (golfer) ( 1887–?), Scottish golfer
 Andy Campbell (curler), Australian curler
 Andy Campbell (speedway rider) (born 1959), English speedway rider

Other 

 Andrew Campbell (professor of law), Scottish academic, solicitor, writer and editor
 Andrew Campbell (bishop) (died 1769), Irish Roman Catholic prelate
 Andrew G. Campbell, American biologist
 Andrew J. Campbell (1828–1894), American politician from New York
 Andrew K. Campbell (1821–1867), American Civil War officer
 Andrew Campbell (priest) (born 1946), Irish-Ghanaian Catholic missionary
 Andrew Campbell (academic) (born 1959), British computer scientist
 Andrew Campbell, 19th-century miller, barkeep, and namesake of Campbellsville, Kentucky